A parent is a caregiver of the offspring in their own species. In humans, a parent is the caretaker of a child (where "child" refers to offspring, not necessarily age). A biological parent is a person whose gamete resulted in a child, a male through the sperm, and a female through the ovum. Biological parents are first-degree relatives and have 50% genetic meet. A female can also become a parent through surrogacy. Some parents may be adoptive parents, who nurture and raise an offspring, but are not biologically related to the child. Orphans without adoptive parents can be raised by their grandparents or other family members.

A parent can also be elaborated as an ancestor removed one generation. With recent medical advances, it is possible to have more than two biological parents. Examples of third biological parents include instances involving surrogacy or a third person who has provided DNA samples during an assisted reproductive procedure that has altered the recipients' genetic material.

The most common types of parents are mothers, fathers, step-parents, and grandparents. A mother is, "a woman in relation to a child or children to whom she has given birth." The extent to which it is socially acceptable for a parent to be involved in their offspring's life varies from culture to culture, however one that exhibits too little involvement is sometimes said to exhibit child neglect, while one that is too involved is sometimes said to be overprotective, cosseting, nosey, or intrusive.

Types

Biological 

A person's biological parents are the persons from whom the individual inherits their genes. The term is generally only used if there is a need to distinguish an individual's parents from their biological parents,  For example, an individual whose father has remarried may call the father's new wife their stepmother and continue to refer to their mother normally, though someone who has had little or no contact with their biological mother may address their foster parent as their mother, and their biological mother as such, or perhaps by her first name.

Mother 

A mother is a female who has a maternal connection with another individual, whether arising from conception, by giving birth to, or raising the individual in the role of a parent. More than one female may have such connections with an individual. Because of the complexity and differences of a mother's social, cultural, and religious definitions and roles, it is challenging to define a mother to suit a universally accepted definition. The utilization of a surrogate mother may result in explication of there being two biological mothers.

Father 

A father is a male parent of any type of offspring. It may be the person who shares in the raising of a child or who has provided the biological material, the sperm, which results in the birth of the child.

Grandparent 

Grandparents are the parents of a person's own parent, whether that be a father or a mother. Every sexually reproducing creature who is not a genetic chimera has a maximum of four genetic grandparents, eight genetic great-grandparents, sixteen genetic great-great-grandparents and so on. Rarely, such as in the case of sibling or half-sibling incest, these numbers are lower.

Paternity issues 

A paternity test is conducted to prove paternity, that is, whether a male is the biological father of another individual. This may be relevant in view of rights and duties of the father. Similarly, a maternity test can be carried out. This is less common, because at least during childbirth and pregnancy, except in the case of a pregnancy involving embryo transfer or egg donation, it is obvious who the mother is. However, it is used in a number of events such as legal battles where a person's maternity is challenged, where the mother is uncertain because she has not seen her child for an extended period of time, or where deceased persons need to be identified.

Although not constituting completely reliable evidence, several congenital traits such as attached earlobes, a widow's peak, or the cleft chin, may serve as tentative indicators of (non-) parenthood as they are readily observable and inherited via autosomal-dominant genes.

A more reliable way to ascertain parenthood is via DNA analysis (known as genetic fingerprinting of individuals), although older methods have included ABO blood group typing, analysis of various other proteins and enzymes, or using human leukocyte antigens. The current techniques for paternity testing are using polymerase chain reaction and restriction fragment length polymorphism. For the most part, however, genetic fingerprinting has all but taken over all the other forms of testing.

Roles and responsibilities

Guardianship 

A legal guardian is a person who has the legal authority (and the corresponding duty) to care for the personal and property interests of another person, called a ward. Guardians are typically used in three situations: guardianship for an incapacitated senior (due to old age or infirmity), guardianship for a minor, and guardianship for developmentally disabled adults.

Most countries and states have laws that provide that the parents of a minor child are the legal guardians of that child, and that the parents can designate who shall become the child's legal guardian in the event of death, subject to the approval of the court. Some jurisdictions allow a parent of a child to exercise the authority of a legal guardian without a formal court appointment. In such circumstances the parent acting in that capacity is called the natural guardian of that parent's child.

Parenting 

Parenting or child rearing is the process of promoting and supporting the physical, emotional, social, financial, and intellectual development of a child from infancy to adulthood. Parenting refers to the aspects of raising a child aside from the biological relationship.

Gender and gender mix 
A child has at least one biological father and at least one biological mother, but not every family is a traditional nuclear family. There are many variants, such as adoption, shared parenting, stepfamilies, and LGBT parenting, over which there has been controversy.

The social science literature rejects the notion that there is an optimal gender mix of parents or that children and adolescents with same-sex parents suffer any developmental disadvantages compared with those with two opposite-sex parents. The professionals and the major associations now agree there is a well-established and accepted consensus in the field that there is no optimal gender combination of parents. The family studies literature indicates that it is family processes (such as the quality of parenting and relationships within the family) that contribute to determining children's well-being and "outcomes," rather than family structures, per se, such as the number, gender, sexuality and co-habitation status of parents.

Genetics

Parent–offspring conflict 

An offspring who hates their father is called a misopater, one that hates their mother is a misomater, while a parent that hates their offspring is a misopedist. Parent–offspring conflict describes the evolutionary conflict arising from differences in optimal fitness of parents and their offspring. While parents tend to maximize the number of offspring, the offspring can increase their fitness by getting a greater share of parental investment often by competing with their siblings. The theory was proposed by Robert Trivers in 1974 and extends the more general selfish gene theory and has been used to explain many observed biological phenomena. For example, in some bird species, although parents often lay two eggs and attempt to raise two or more young, the strongest fledgling takes a greater share of the food brought by parents and will often kill the weaker sibling, an act known as siblicide.

Empathy
David Haig has argued that human fetal genes would be selected to draw more resources from the mother than it would be optimal for the mother to give, a hypothesis that has received empirical support. The placenta, for example, secretes allocrine hormones that decrease the sensitivity of the mother to insulin and thus make a larger supply of blood sugar available to the fetus. The mother responds by increasing the level of insulin in her bloodstream, the placenta has insulin receptors that stimulate the production of insulin-degrading enzymes which counteract this effect.

Having children and happiness

In Europe, parents are generally happier than non-parents. In women, happiness increases after the first child, but having higher-order children is not associated with further increased well-being. Happiness seems to increase most in the year before and after the first childbirth.

See also

References

External links

 National Educational Network, Inc. (NENI) – free online resources for parent education, curriculum. They also have a parent blog with information about child care, after-school, trends in education, tutoring, college, grants, etc.
  – A Roman Catholic view of the position of parents.

Family
Motherhood
Fatherhood
Infancy
 
Positions of authority